Gunslinger is the tenth studio album by American country music artist Garth Brooks, released on November 25, 2016 by Pearl Records. The album's lead single, "Baby, Let's Lay Down and Dance", was released on October 13, 2016.

Reception

The album has been given a Metacritic score of 65 based on 5 critics, indicating generally favorable reviews.

The album debuted at No. 4 on the Top Country Albums chart, selling 19,000 copies in its first week as a standalone album. The album has sold 146,700 copies in the US as of March 2018.

A Walmart exclusive that bundled Christmas Together with Gunslinger was released the week before the album itself was released, and debuted at No. 14 on the Top 10 Country Albums chart with 6,600 copies sold. This bundle reached No. 3 on that chart, selling 23,000 copies in the second week.

Track listing

Personnel

Vocals

Garth Brooks – vocals
Karyn Rochelle – backing vocals
Trisha Yearwood – backing vocals 

Musicians

Roy Agee – horns
Sam Bacco – drums, percussion
Jeff Bailey – horns
Preston Bailey – horns
Eddie Bayers – drums and percussion
Bruce Bouton – steel guitar
Jimmy Bowland – horns
Dennis Burnside – horn arrangements and conductor 
David Campbell – string arrangements
Mike Chapman – bass guitar
Mark Douthit – horns
Barry Green – horns
Kenny Greenberg – acoustic and electric guitars
Rob Hajacos – fiddle
Mike Haynes – horns
Prentiss Hobbs – horns
Chris Leuzinger – electric guitar
Chris McDonald – horns
Blair Masters – keyboards
Jimmy Mattingly – fiddle
Doug Moffett – horns
Brian Frasier-Moore – drums and percussion 
Billy Panda – acoustic guitar
Steve Patrick – horns
Danny Rader – bouzouki, mandolin
Mitch Rossell – acoustic guitar on "Ask Me How I Know"
Robbie Shankle – horns
Milton Sledge – drums and percussion
Eric Smith – bass guitar
Denis Solee – horns
Bobby Wood – keyboards
Bob Wray – bass guitar
Nashville String Machine – strings

Production 
Matthew "Buster" Allen – engineer
Don Cobb – mastering
Eric Conn – mastering 
John Kelton – engineer
Mark Miller – mixing, producer

Charts

Weekly charts

Year-end charts

Singles

References

2016 albums
Garth Brooks albums